Matjaž Han (born 17 January 1971, in Celje, Slovenia) is a Slovenian politician. He currently serves as the Minister of Economic Development and Technology since 1 June 2022. Prior to his appointment as minister, he was a Member of the National Assembly of the Republic of Slovenia since 2004 and a long-time leader of the Social Democrats' parliamentary group.

Early life and career 
He attended the Secondary Trade and Commercial School in Celje. He co-founded the family company M and M international with his father and worked as its director between 1992 and 2004. He co-founded the family company M and M international with his father and worked as its director between 1992 and 2004. In 2006, he became the mayor of the municipality of Radeče. In 2010, he was re-elected mayor.

In the 2011, parliamentary elections, he ran on the Social Democrats platform; with the confirmation of his parliamentary mandate, his mayoral function automatically ended. In 2013, he became the leader of the Social Democrats' parliamentary group and served in the National Assembly until 2022. He was member of the Committee on Economy and Committee on Internal Policy, Public Administration and Justice of the National Assembly of Slovenia. He was appointed Minister of Economic Development and Technology in the 15th Government of Slovenia on 1 June 2022 by Robert Golob.

References 

1971 births
Living people
21st-century Slovenian politicians
Government ministers of Slovenia
Social Democrats (Slovenia) politicians
People from Celje